Adikaratti is a panchayat town in The Nilgiris district in the Indian state of Tamil Nadu.

Demographics
 India census, Adikaratti had a population of 15,996. Males constitute 48% of the population and females 52%. Adikaratti has an average literacy rate of 72%, higher than the national average of 59.5%; with 54% of the males and 46% of females literate. 9% of the population is under 6 years of age.

References

Cities and towns in Nilgiris district